The Swingin' Sixties is the second compilation album released by The Brilliant Green. It was released on July 23, 2014. The album contains a selection of the band's songs, described as "love songs and hits", re-recorded in a 60's style. The album also contains one new track, "A Little World". The album debuted at #18 on the Oricon Albums chart.

Track listing

Charts

References

2014 compilation albums
The Brilliant Green albums
Warner Music Japan compilation albums